is a Japanese table tennis player. He won one of the bronze medals in the men's singles and men's team events at the 2021 Asian Table Tennis Championships held in Doha, Qatar. He also won the gold medal in both the men's doubles and mixed doubles events. He won the 2022 Japan Championships beating Kenta Matsudaira in the final 4-2.

References

External links

Living people
2001 births
Place of birth missing (living people)
Japanese male table tennis players
World Table Tennis Championships medalists